Zoran Vuletić may refer to:

 Zoran Vuletić (politician) (born 1970), Serbian politician
 Zoran Vuletić (musician) (born 1960), Croatian keyboardist, of the band Haustor